Stage is the second live album by English musician David Bowie, recorded on the Isolar II Tour, and released through RCA Records in 1978. Stage has been reissued numerous times, each with expanded track listings.

Recording
The recording was culled from concerts in Philadelphia, Providence, and Boston, US, in late April and early May 1978. It primarily included material from Bowie's most recent studio albums to that date, Station to Station, Low, and "Heroes" (both 1977), but also contained five songs from The Rise and Fall of Ziggy Stardust and the Spiders from Mars (1972). Aside from Bowie's core team of Carlos Alomar, Dennis Davis, and George Murray, the band included ex-Frank Zappa sideman Adrian Belew on guitar, Simon House from Hawkwind on electric violin, Roger Powell, best known for his work with Todd Rundgren in the group Utopia, on keyboards, and Sean Mayes on piano, string ensemble and backup vocals. All would reunite the following year on Bowie's next studio LP, Lodger (1979).

In the liner notes for the CD reissue (2005), recording engineer Tony Visconti explains that the "ambient" songs were recorded via a direct electronic feed from the instruments rather than through microphones, and that the audience was turned "way down during these performances". Apparently the US audiences (contrary to Australian audiences, for instance) were, in Visconti's words, "a little too impatient for David to get on with the rock songs".

Reception

Stage was a commercial success. In the UK, it reached No. 5 and was subsequently certified gold by the British Phonographic Industry (BPI). It also reached No. 44 on the US charts.

"Breaking Glass", which originally appeared in shorter form on Low, was released as a 3-track EP and reached number 54 on the UK singles chart. In the US, "Star" was released as a 3-track EP, but failed to chart. In Japan "Soul Love" was released, with "Blackout" on the B-side, but also failed to chart.

Generally considered more relaxed than Bowie's previous live album, David Live, Stage was praised on its initial vinyl release for the fidelity with which the band was able to emulate in concert the electronic and effects-filled numbers from Low and "Heroes", as well as for the singer's vocal performance.  At the same time, because Bowie had rarely tampered with the arrangements – in contrast to his method on David Live – Stage added little to what was available on the original albums, and was seen by some commentators as simply a marketing exercise that did not do justice to a memorable series of live concerts.   The album was criticised for lacking a 'live' atmosphere, thanks to the recording being largely taken from direct instrument and microphone feeds, which increased sound quality but minimised crowd noise. The original concert running order was also changed, with fades between tracks similar to a studio album.  Even the cover picture came in for criticism, more so because the rest of the package contained only variations of the same shot.

In a review of the 1991 rerelease, Mat Snow of Q stated that "performances are faster than the studio originals and suffer for it; what they gain in live jauntiness – not exactly a quality they were crying out for – they lose in power and intensity."

A 2005 reissue saw many of the criticisms of the original LP addressed. In his review of the reissue, Chris Roberts of Uncut said that the combination of Low/Heroes-period material and songs from Ziggy Stardust resulted in a live album that was an "eerie clattering between two stools". He said that the improvements in sound carried out by Tony Visconti and the addition of "Stay" and "the brilliant 'Be My Wife'" made the new version of Stage "essential for Dave-freaks, anyway".

The album is included in The Quietus' list of its writers' "40 Favourite Live Albums".

Track listings

Original 1978 LP

The cassette release places "Speed of Life" between "Fame" and "TVC 15".

Rereleases
Stage has been rereleased on CD four times to date, the first being in 1984 by RCA Records, then in 1991 by Rykodisc (containing a bonus track), later in 2005 by EMI, and most recently in 2017 by Parlophone (also on vinyl). The running order of the 2005 and 2017 editions reflects the actual performance, removing fades between tracks, and including previously unreleased performances as bonus tracks.

The 1984 rerelease on CD (catalogue number PD89002) contains the same running order as the original LP, and comes on two discs (despite the double-LP release being short enough to fit on a single CD unaltered). Some of the European-distributed CDs were manufactured in Japan, but cover and assembling were made in Europe. Most of the CDs were made in Germany.

1991 rerelease
In 1991, Stage was rereleased on CD, with the same running order as the original LP, with "Alabama Song" included as a bonus track.

2005 rerelease

The 2005 CD reissue features a new running order, reflecting the original setlist of the concerts as performed. Two previously unreleased performances were included on the album as bonus tracks.

2017 rerelease

In 2017, the album was included, in two versions, in the A New Career in a New Town (1977–1982) box set released by Parlophone.  One version contained the original mix and the same list and ordering of tracks that had appeared on the original vinyl album; the other was a new version of the album, based on the 2005 edition but including two previously unreleased songs from the concerts. The latter was also released separately, in 2-CD and 3-LP formats, in 2018.

Personnel
According to author Roger Griffin:
David Bowie – vocals, keyboards
Carlos Alomar – rhythm guitar
George Murray – bass
Dennis Davis – drums, percussion
Adrian Belew – lead guitar
Simon House – violin
Sean Mayes – piano, string ensemble
Roger Powell – synthesizer, keyboards

Charts

Certifications and sales

References

Works cited
Roy Carr and Charles Shaar Murray (1981). Bowie: An Illustrated Record
David Buckley (1999). Strange Fascination – David Bowie: The Definitive Story
Nicholas Pegg (2000). The Complete David Bowie

External links

Albums produced by Tony Visconti
David Bowie live albums
1978 live albums
RCA Records live albums
Rykodisc live albums
Virgin Records live albums
EMI Records live albums
Albums produced by David Bowie